Fascia of pelvic diaphragm may refer to:

 Inferior fascia of pelvic diaphragm
 Superior fascia of pelvic diaphragm